Epomis nigricans is a species of ground beetle native to the Palearctic. It is known from China, Japan, North Korea, and South Korea.

Adult beetles are metallic copper-green colored, with a striking yellow-orange rim on the elytra and mostly yellow-colored legs and antennae. They are 19.5-22 millimeters in length.

The larvae reach a body length of up to 20 millimeters ; they are yellow with black markings. Like many ground beetle larvae they are elongated with two extensions (OroGomphi) at the rear end. They have characteristic double-hooked mandibles. The larvae feed exclusively on amphibians, which they lure by making prey-like movements. The adult beetles are generalist predators, but can also feed on amphibians much larger than themselves.

References 

Licininae
Beetles described in 1821